Saïda El Mehdi (born 21 September 1981) is a Moroccan middle distance runner who specializes in the 800 and 1500 metres.

In 2004, she won an 800 m gold medal and a 1500 m silver medal at the 2004 African Championships in Athletics and she was the 1500 m bronze medallist at the 2004 Pan Arab Games. The following year she won medals in both events at the 2005 Jeux de la Francophonie.

She was suspended for two years after she failed a doping test at the Meeting SEAT in Paris in February 2009. Having tested positive for the steroid stanozolol, she was banned from competition until 29 April 2011.

Achievements

Personal bests
800 metres - 2:01.85 (2006)
1500 metres - 4:08.60 (2004)
3000 metres - 9:04.69 (2006)

See also
List of doping cases in athletics

References

External links
 

1981 births
Living people
Moroccan female middle-distance runners
Moroccan sportspeople in doping cases
Doping cases in athletics
20th-century Moroccan women
21st-century Moroccan women